Tonto Basin is a census-designated place (CDP) in Gila County, Arizona, United States. The population was 1,424 at the 2010 United States Census, up from 840 in 2000.

Within Tonto Basin is located the unincorporated community of Punkin Center.

History
The Pleasant Valley War (also sometimes called the Tonto Basin War or Feud) was an 1886 Arizona range war between two feuding families, the cattle-herding Grahams and the sheep-herding Tewksburys.

Geography
Tonto Basin is located in western Gila County at  (33.839953, -111.284734), in the valley of Tonto Creek, a south-flowing tributary of the Salt River. Arizona State Route 188 passes through the community, leading southeast  to Globe, the county seat, and north  to Payson.

Demographics

As of the census of 2000, there were 840 people, 439 households, and 262 families residing in the CDP. There were 726 housing units at an average density of 23.1/sq mi (8.9/km2). The racial makeup of the CDP was 96.1% White, 1.4% Native American, 0.9% from other races, and 1.6% from two or more races.  2.0% of the population were Hispanic or Latino of any race.

There were 439 households, out of which 9.1% had children under the age of 18 living with them, 51.0% were married couples living together, 7.1% had a female householder with no husband present, and 40.3% were non-families. 33.9% of all households were made up of individuals, and 16.9% had someone living alone who was 65 years of age or older.  The average household size was 1.91 and the average family size was 2.38.

In the CDP, the population was spread out, with 10.4% under the age of 18, 3.6% from 18 to 24, 13.5% from 25 to 44, 39.9% from 45 to 64, and 32.7% who were 65 years of age or older.  The median age was 58 years. For every 100 females, there were 107.4 males.  For every 100 females age 18 and over, there were 103.0 males.

The median income for a household in the CDP was $23,398, and the median income for a family was $29,091. Males had a median income of $30,125 versus $17,500 for females. The per capita income for the CDP was $15,157.  About 15.9% of families and 18.3% of the population were below the poverty line, including 16.9% of those under age 18 and 12.3% of those age 65 or over.

Notable person
 Frederick Russell Burnham participated on the losing side in the Tonto Basin Feud of 1886 and narrowly escaped alive. After the feud, he went home to California and left for Africa only a few years later.

In popular culture
 Tonto Basin is a 1921 Western novel by Zane Grey about a feud between two families.
 Tonto Basin Outlaws is a 1941 film based very loosely on the Tonto Basin Feud. Cowboys are out to stop a cattle-rustling scandal soon after they enlist with Teddy Roosevelt's Rough Riders. In the real-life feud, one man did go on to join the Rough Riders.
 To the Last Man (film) is a 1933 Henry Hathaway film based on the Zane Grey novel starring Randolph Scott, Esther Ralston, Buster Crabbe, Barton MacLane, Noah Beery, Shirley Temple, and Eugenie Besserer.
 According to an NPR story on the Lone Ranger, Tonto Basin is the inspiration for Tonto, the Native American companion to the Lone Ranger.

See also
 Battle of Turret Peak
 Battle of Salt River Canyon

References

Census-designated places in Gila County, Arizona
Census-designated places in Arizona